Satungal is a village and former Village Development Committee that is now part of Chandragiri Municipality in Kathmandu District in Province No. 3 of central Nepal. Satungal is also known as Satyapur ( In Newar Language). At the time of the 1991 Nepal census it had a population of 2,730 people living in 464 households.
By the time of the 2001 Nepal census the population had grown to 5,834, spread over 1,375 households. At that time 5,173 of the village population were literate - a literacy rate of 88.7%.

References

Populated places in Kathmandu District